Johnson Township is an inactive township in Ripley County, in the U.S. state of Missouri.

Johnson Township was erected in 1871, and named after William Johnson, an early citizen.

References

Townships in Missouri
Townships in Ripley County, Missouri